

A05A Bile therapy

A05AA Bile acids and derivatives
A05AA01 Chenodeoxycholic acid
A05AA02 Ursodeoxycholic acid
A05AA03 Cholic acid
A05AA04 Obeticholic acid

A05AB Preparations for biliary tract therapy
A05AB01 Nicotinyl methylamide

A05AX Other drugs for bile therapy
A05AX01 Piprozolin
A05AX02 Hymecromone
A05AX03 Cyclobutyrol
A05AX04 Maralixibat chloride
A05AX05 Odevixibat
QA05AX90 Menbutone

A05B Liver therapy, lipotropics

A05BA Liver therapy
A05BA01 Arginine glutamate
A05BA03 Silymarin
A05BA04 Citiolone
A05BA05 Epomediol
A05BA06 Ornithine oxoglutarate
A05BA07 Tidiacic arginine
A05BA08 Glycyrrhizic acid (glycyrrhizin)
A05BA09 Metadoxine
A05BA10 Phospholipids
QA05BA90 Methionine

A05C Drugs for bile therapy and lipotropics in combination
Empty group

References

Hepatology
A05